Farhan Khan can refer to:

 Farhan Khan (actor) (born 1983), an Indian actor
 Farhan Khan (Omani cricketer), (born 1975) a Pakistan-born Omani cricketer
 Farhan Khan (Quetta cricketer), (born 1990) a Pakistani cricketer
 Farhan Khan (Lahore cricketer) (born 1990), a Pakistani cricketer